List of types of malnutrition or list of nutritional disorders include diseases that results from excessive or inadequate intake of food and nutrients.

Overnutrition

Metabolic 

Obesity is caused by eating too many calories compared to the amount of exercise the individual is performing, causing a distorted energy balance.  It can lead to diseases such as cardiovascular disease and diabetes. Obesity is a condition in which the natural energy reserve, stored in the fatty tissue of humans and other mammals, is increased to a point where it is associated with certain health conditions or increased mortality.

The low-cost food that is generally affordable to the poor in affluent nations is low in nutritional value and high in fats, sugars and additives.  In rich countries, therefore, obesity is often a sign of poverty and malnutrition while in poorer countries obesity is more associated with wealth and good nutrition.  Other non-nutritional causes for obesity included: sleep deprivation, stress, lack of exercise, and heredity.

Acute overeating can also be a symptom of an eating disorder.

Goitrogenic foods can cause goitres by interfering with iodine uptake.

Vitamins and micronutrients 

Vitamin poisoning is the condition of overly high storage levels of vitamins, which can lead to toxic symptoms. The medical names of the different conditions are derived from the vitamin involved: an excess of vitamin A, for example, is called "hypervitaminosis A".

Iron overload disorders are diseases caused by the overaccumulation of iron in the body. Organs commonly affected are the liver, heart and endocrine glands in the mouth.

Deficiencies

Proteins/fats/carbohydrates
 Protein malnutrition
 Kwashiorkor
 Marasmus

Dietary minerals
 Calcium
 Osteoporosis
 Rickets
 Tetany
 Iodine deficiency
 Goiter
 Selenium deficiency
 Keshan disease
 Iron deficiency
 Iron deficiency anemia
 Zinc 
 Growth retardation
 Thiamine (Vitamin B1)
 Beriberi
 Niacin (Vitamin B3)
 Pellagra
 Vitamin C
 Scurvy
 Vitamin D
 Osteoporosis
 Rickets
 Vitamin A
 Night Blindness 
 Vitamin K
 Haemophilia

Dietetics
Nutritional diseases
Lists of diseases